The National Outbreak Reporting System (NORS) is an electronic, web-accessible system designed to improve the quality, quantity, and availability of data for waterborne, foodborne person-to-person zoonotic (animal-to-person) enteric disease outbreaks in the United States.

NORS launched in 2009 for use by staff working within public health departments in individual states, territories, and the Freely Associated States (composed of the Republic of the Marshall Islands, the Federated States of Micronesia and the Republic of Palau; formerly parts of the U.S.-administered Trust Territories of the Pacific Islands). Health departments are responsible for determining which staff members have access to NORS.

Separate sections in NORS for enteric person-to-person and animal-to-person disease outbreak reports are intended to enhance the information available to quantify, describe, and understand these types of outbreaks at a national level.

History 
NORS replaced the electronic Foodborne Outbreak Reporting System (eFORS), which was the primary tool for reporting foodborne disease outbreaks to the U.S. Centers for Disease Control and Prevention (CDC) since 2001. NORS also replaced the paper-based reporting system used during 1971–2008 to report waterborne disease outbreaks to the Waterborne Disease and Outbreak Reporting System (WBDOSS). The transition to electronic waterborne disease outbreak reporting is in large part a response to the Council of State and Territorial Epidemiologists (CSTE) position statement titled "Improving Detection, Investigation, and Reporting of Waterborne Disease Outbreaks."

See also

 Waterborne Disease and Outbreak Reporting System (WBDOSS)

References

External links
 Council of State and Territorial Epidemiologists
 National Outbreak Reporting System (NORS) - Provides information on NORS, including forms and video training on using the NORS system.
 OutbreakNet Team at the United States Centers for Disease Control and Prevention.

Epidemiology
Centers for Disease Control and Prevention